Guman Singh Chamling was a writer and a novelist in the Nepali language. He was from Darjeeling district, India. He received the Sahitya Akademi Award in 1979 for his collection of essays Maulo.

References

Nepali-language writers from India
Recipients of the Sahitya Akademi Award in Nepali
People from Darjeeling district
Indian Gorkhas
Living people
Year of birth missing (living people)